Hannes Neuner (27 August 1906 – 25 April 1978) was a German painter. His work was part of the painting event in the art competition at the 1936 Summer Olympics.

References

1906 births
1978 deaths
20th-century German painters
20th-century German male artists
German male painters
Olympic competitors in art competitions
People from Aschaffenburg